Mary Graham (née Wissler) is an American writer and co-director of the Transparency Policy Project at Harvard University's John F. Kennedy School of Government.

She has written four books on the politics of public information. Presidents' Secrets: The Use and Abuse of Hidden Power, was published in 2017. In 2007, with co-authors Boston University professor David Weil and Harvard University professor Archon Fung, she wrote Full Disclosure: The Perils and Promise of Transparency. In 2002, she wrote Democracy by Disclosure: The Rise of Technopopulism. In 1999, she wrote The Morning after Earth Day: Practical Environmental Politics.

Graham has written for the Atlantic Monthly, Financial Times, Environment , Issues in Science and Technology, and other publications. She has a J.D. degree from Georgetown University Law Center and an undergraduate degree from Harvard-Radcliffe. From 1967 to 2007, she was married to former Washington Post publisher Donald Graham. They have four adult children.

From 2001 to 2013 Graham was a board member for the Chicago-based MacArthur Foundation. In 2010, she joined the advisory board for the Wikimedia Foundation's Public Policy Initiative.

Earlier in her career, she practiced law in Washington, DC, worked on regulatory reform at the U.S. Department of Transportation, and worked on legislative and budget issues at the U.S. Office of Management and Budget.

Graham is a trustee of the Juilliard School for the Performing Arts and a member of the visiting committee of the Columbia University School of Journalism.

She also serves as a trustee emerita of the John D. and Catherine T. MacArthur Foundation, and serves on the board of directors of The Pew Charitable Trusts.

References

External links 

Mary Graham at the Ash Center for Democratic Governance and Innovation

Year of birth missing (living people)
Living people
Radcliffe College alumni
American political writers
Georgetown University Law Center alumni
Harvard Kennedy School people
Wikimedia Foundation Advisory Board members
The Pew Charitable Trusts people